Hanging Rock is an unincorporated community in Hampshire County in the U.S. state of West Virginia. Hanging Rock is named for the "Hanging Rock" outcrop that hangs over the Northwestern Turnpike (U.S. Route 50). It should not be confused with the plural "Hanging Rocks" over the South Branch Potomac River north of Romney at Wapocomo. Originally, the community of Hanging Rock sprang up in the Henderson Hollow gap of North River Mountain. While only a few buildings of the old hamlet remain, today's Hanging Rock is situated at the intersection of North River Road (County Route 50/21) and Delray Road (West Virginia Route 29) where the North River flows under U.S. Route 50 towards the Cacapon.

On April 16, 1756, Daniel Morgan was wounded during a Native American attack near Hanging Rock while on the road to Winchester. The attack also resulted in the death of his two companions. Morgan managed to remain in his saddle and escaped with neck and mouth wounds towards Fort Edwards on the Cacapon River near Capon Bridge.

The rock formation's vicinity was also the scene of skirmishes between Union and Confederate troops in 1861. This American Civil War engagement is often referred to as "The Battle of Hanging Rocks" or the "Battle of Hanging Rocks Pass."

References 

Unincorporated communities in Hampshire County, West Virginia
Unincorporated communities in West Virginia
Northwestern Turnpike
Canyons and gorges of West Virginia
Rock formations of West Virginia
Hampshire County, West Virginia, in the American Civil War
Landforms of Hampshire County, West Virginia
American Civil War sites in West Virginia